The Ioannina Eyalet  was an administrative territorial entity of the Ottoman Empire located in the territory of present-day southern Albania, central and northern Greece. It was formed in 1670 and its administrative centre was Ioannina. During the period 1788–1822, Ali Pasha (sanjakbey of Trikala) seized control over Ioannina and after enlisting most of the local brigands under his own banner took advantage of a weak Ottoman government to gain control over the Ioannina Eyalet and most of Albania and continental Greece, transforming it into the semi-autonomous Pashalik of Yanina. After he was killed in 1822 the Ottoman Empire reestablished the Ioannina Eyalet which existed until establishment of the Janina Vilayet in 1867.

Administrative divisions
Sanjaks of the Eyalet in the mid-19th century:
 Sanjak of Berat
 Sanjak of Arghiri (Ergiri)
 Sanjak of Ioannina
 Sanjak of Narda (Arta)

References

Further reading 
 

Eyalets of the Ottoman Empire in Europe
1670 establishments in the Ottoman Empire
1867 disestablishments in the Ottoman Empire